Steve Shnider is a retired professor of mathematics at Bar Ilan University.
He received a PhD in Mathematics from Harvard University in 1972, under Shlomo Sternberg.
His main interests are in the differential geometry of fiber bundles; algebraic methods in the theory of deformation of geometric structures; symplectic geometry; supersymmetry; operads; and Hopf algebras.
He retired in 2014.

Book on operads
A 2002 book of Markl, Shnider and Stasheff Operads in algebra, topology, and physics was the first book to  provide a systematic treatment of operad theory, an area of mathematics that came to prominence in 1990s and  found many applications in algebraic topology, category theory, graph cohomology, representation theory, algebraic geometry, combinatorics, knot theory, moduli spaces, and other areas. The book was the subject of a Featured Review in Mathematical Reviews by Alexander A. Voronov which stated, in particular: "The first book whose main goal is the theory of operads per se ... a book such as this one has been long awaited by a wide scientific readership, including mathematicians and theoretical physicists ... a great piece of mathematical literature and will be helpful to anyone who needs to use operads, from graduate students to mature mathematicians and physicists."

Bibliography
According to Mathematical Reviews, Shnider's work has been cited over 300 times  by over 300 authors by 2010.

Books

Selected papers 
.

References

21st-century Israeli mathematicians
Living people
Geometers
Harvard University alumni
Year of birth missing (living people)